Monstera integrifolia is a species of flowering plant in the genus Monstera in the arum family, Araceae.

Distribution 
Its native range is Costa Rica to Panama.

References 

integrifolia